Robert James King (born 1 October 1986) is an ex English professional footballer. He was born in Chelmsford.

King began his career as a trainee with Colchester United, turning professional in July 2004. On 9 September 2005, he made his league debut, replacing Pat Baldwin in the 74th minute of a 0–0 draw at Bristol City. He played twice more as a substitute in the league for Colchester and started two Football League Trophy games. In January 2006, shortly after returning from a loan spell with Staines Town, King played for Cambridge United's reserve side and looked set to join them on loan. joining Conference National Hereford United on loan in March 2006 until the end of the season.

On his return to Colchester, King failed to break back into the first team and was loaned to Heybridge Swifts on loan in January 2007.

King left Colchester to join Heybridge Swifts on 16 July 2007.

References

External links

1986 births
Living people
Sportspeople from Chelmsford
English footballers
English Jews
Association football midfielders
Colchester United F.C. players
Hereford United F.C. players
Staines Town F.C. players
Heybridge Swifts F.C. players
Canvey Island F.C. players
English Football League players
National League (English football) players
Isthmian League players